Rhodochlaena is a genus of moths of the family Noctuidae.

Species
Some of the known species of this genus are:
Rhodochlaena albidior	Krüger, 2005 (from Lesotho)
Rhodochlaena botonga		(Felder & Rogenhofer, 1874) (from South Africa)
Rhodochlaena cuneifera		Hampson, 1910 (from Congo)
Rhodochlaena dinshoense		(Laporte, 1984) (from Ethiopia)
Rhodochlaena hadenaeformis		Krüger, 2005 (from Lesotho)

References

Natural History Museum Lepidoptera genus database

Cuculliinae
Noctuoidea genera